Pseudochromis viridis, also known as the Green dottyback, is a species of ray-finned fish from the Eastern Indian Ocean around Christmas Island. which is a member of the family Pseudochromidae.

References

viridis
Taxa named by Anthony C. Gill
Taxa named by Gerald R. Allen
Fish described in 1996